Sentinelese is the undescribed language of the Sentinelese people of North Sentinel Island in the Andaman and Nicobar Islands, India. Due to the lack of contact between the Sentinelese people and the rest of the world, essentially nothing is known of their language, or its vitality. The Sentinelese people do not allow outsiders onto the island and are generally hostile towards visitors. Friendly interactions have been rare.

According to the diary of John Allen Chau, an American Christian missionary killed on North Sentinel Island, the Sentinelese language consists of "high-pitched sounds", and the people use hand gestures when speaking.

Classification
It is presumed that the islanders speak a single language and that it is a member of one of the Andamanese language families. Based on what little is known about similarities in culture and technology and their geographical proximity, it is supposed that their language is related to the Ongan languages, such as Jarawa, rather than to Great Andamanese. On the documented occasions when Onge-speaking individuals were taken to North Sentinel Island in order to attempt communication, they were unable to recognise any of the language spoken by the inhabitants. It has been recorded that the Jarawa and Sentinelese languages are mutually unintelligible.

Status
Sentinelese is classified as endangered due to the small number of speakers, matching the unknown population of the island, which has been estimated at anywhere from 100 to 250; a rough estimate by the Government of India is 100.

References

Andamanese languages
Unattested languages of Asia
Endangered unclassified languages